The "Duetto buffo di due gatti" (humorous duet for two cats) is a performance piece for two sopranos and piano. Often performed as a comical concert encore, it consists entirely of the repeated word miau ("meow") sung by the singers. It is sometimes performed by a soprano and a tenor, or a soprano and a bass.

While the piece is typically attributed to Gioachino Rossini, it was not actually written by him, but is instead a compilation written in 1825 that draws principally on his 1816 opera Otello. Hubert Hunt claims that the compiler was Robert Lucas de Pearsall, who for this purpose adopted the pseudonym "G. Berthold".

Structure 
In order of appearance, the piece consists of:
the "Katte-Cavatine" by the Danish composer C. E. F. Weyse
part of the duet for Otello and Jago in act 2 of Otello
part of the cabaletta to the aria "Ah, come mai non senti", sung by Rodrigo in the same act

Recordings
Some albums including this piece are:
A Most Unusual Song Recital, Christa Ludwig (mezzo-soprano), Walter Berry (bass-baritone), Gerald Moore, piano, released 1969
A Tribute to Gerald Moore, EMI Classics: Victoria de los Ángeles (soprano), Elisabeth Schwarzkopf (soprano), Gerald Moore (piano), released 2003 (expanded reissue of 1969 release), also known as "Le Duo des Chats"
Sweet Power of Song, EMI Classics: Felicity Lott (soprano), Ann Murray (mezzo-soprano), Graham Johnson (piano), released 1990
Duets for Two Sopranos, BIS: Elisabeth Söderström (soprano) and Kerstin Meyer (mezzo-soprano),  (piano), released 1992
The Best of Rossini, EMI Classics, MESPLE/BERBIE/REISS, released 1992
Wir Schwestern zwei, wir schönen (1996), Edita Gruberová (soprano), Vesselina Kasarova (mezzo-soprano), Friedrich Haider (piano). Last track, also identified as "Katzen-Duett"
Von ganzem Herzen, Catalyst: Montserrat Caballé, Montserrat Martí, released 1998

See also
"Duo miaulé" in L'enfant et les sortilèges
Duett: "Nun, liebes Weibchen ... Miau! Miau!" (Lubano, Lubanara), in Der Stein der Weisen (Wolfgang Amadeus Mozart et al.)

References

Further reading
 Andrew Cooper, "Rossini's Cat Duet", message to OPERA-L, June 17, 2004.

External links
 
 
 Score at el-atril.com
 , Felicity Lott (soprano), Ann Murray (mezzo-soprano), Andrew Davis (piano), BBC Proms 1996

Female vocal duets
Humor in classical music
Songs about cats
1825 compositions